Chandgad Assembly constituency is one of the 288 Vidhan Sabha (legislative assembly) constituencies in Maharashtra state in western India.

Overview
Chandgad (constituency number 271) is one of the ten Vidhan Sabha constituencies located in the Kolhapur district. This constituency covers the entire Chandgad tehsil and parts of the Ajra and Gadhinglaj tehsils of this district.

Chandgad is part of the Kolhapur Lok Sabha constituency along with five other Vidhan Sabha segments in this district, namely Radhanagari, Kagal, Kolhapur South, Karvir and Kolhapur North.

Members of Legislative Assembly

See also
 Chandgad
 List of constituencies of Maharashtra Vidhan Sabha

References

Assembly constituencies of Kolhapur district
Assembly constituencies of Maharashtra